is a Japanese voice actress who works for Theater Echo.

Notable filmography
Tomomi Mizuno in Dokyusei 2
Barry the Chopper (female disguise) in Fullmetal Alchemist
Miyuki/Mrs. One in Magical Girl Pretty Sammy TV
Nikita in Romeo no Aoi Sora
Mami Honda in Super GALS! Kotobuki Ran
Yuka Sugimoto in Twelve Kingdoms
Lunge's Daughter in Monster (manga)

Dubbing

Live-action
Gulliver's Travels, Lilliputian Rose (Gemma Whelan)
I Love You Phillip Morris, Debbie (Leslie Mann)
Public Enemies, Billie Frechette (Marion Cotillard)

Animation
Rio, Linda

References

External links
 
Aya Ishizu at Ryu's Seiyuu Info

1972 births
Living people
Japanese voice actresses